"If I Can Dream" is a song made famous by Elvis Presley, written by Walter Earl Brown for the singer and notable for its similarities with Martin Luther King Jr.'s 1963 "I Have a Dream" speech. The song was published by Elvis Presley's music publishing company Gladys Music. It was recorded by Presley in June 1968, just two months after King's assassination. The recording was first released to the public as the finale of Presley's '68 Comeback Special.

History 
Composer Billy Goldenberg and lyricist Walter Earl Brown were asked to write a song to replace "I'll Be Home for Christmas" as the grand finale on NBC's Elvis, taped from June 20–23, 1968 (now also known as ‘68 Comeback Special). Knowing about Presley’s fondness for Martin Luther King Jr., and about his devastation related to his then-recent assassination in Memphis, Brown wrote "If I Can Dream" with Presley in mind. After Presley heard the demo, he proclaimed: "I'm never going to sing another song I don't believe in. I'm never going to make another movie I don't believe in".

Goldenberg removed his name from the credits to avoid a publishing dispute. The song was published by Presley's company Gladys Music, Inc.

After Colonel Tom Parker heard the demo of the song sent by Earl Brown, he said: "This ain't Elvis' kind of song." Elvis was also there, and he countered Parker's argument, then he pleaded: "Let me give it a shot, man."  Earl Brown said while Elvis recorded the song, he saw tears rolling down the cheeks of the backing vocalists. One of them whispered to him: "Elvis never sung with so much emotion.  Looks like he means every word." Presley associate Jerry Schilling has said, "I consider Elvis to be a writer on this song. That song was him expressing how he truly felt."

Recording success 
After filming for the TV special was complete with its eventual editing, the song was released as a single with “Edge of Reality” as the flip side on 22 November 1968, with the TV special airing 11 days later. It charted on Billboard's Hot 100 for 3 months and a week, peaking at #12, with more than one million sales; although the RIAA certified the song as only gold (500,000 units shipped) as of March 27, 1992. In Canada, the song peaked at #6 on RPMs top singles chart, maintaining that position for two weeks.

Chart history

Weekly charts

Year-end charts

Certifications

Compilations 
The song appeared in many Presley compilations, of which many are related to the '68 Comeback Special or Inspirational collections. Sony BMG remastered the song in 2004. The song is referred to as stereo mix (as opposed to the 2004 remaster honorific) in '68 Comeback Special releases after 2004. Other compilations, such as Platinum: A Life In Music, include alternative takes on the song less polished than the official takes. For instance, the background vocalists are not present in most of these takes, specifically with "If I Can Dream". According to unsubstantiated rumors, Presley nailed the perfect take after the backing vocalists left the studio.

Cover versions
 In 1990, Barry Manilow's cover reached #81 on the UK Singles Chart.
 Michael Ball's version went to #51 in the UK in 1992.
 A 2010 version by Terry Venables went to #23 in the UK.
 At the Eurovision Song Contest 2022, Italian band Måneskin performed a version of the song that was later included in the soundtrack of the film Elvis. The song reached #95 on the Lithuanian charts.

See also
List of anti-war songs
Civil rights movement in popular culture

References

External links
 

Songs about dreams
1960s ballads
Elvis Presley songs
Barry Manilow songs
Michael Ball songs
Protest songs
Anti-war songs
1968 singles
1968 songs
Pop ballads
RCA Records singles
Songs from television series
Songs about Martin Luther King Jr.
Songs against racism and xenophobia